Sərkar (also, Sərkarh) is a village in the municipality of Qırıqlı in the Goygol Rayon of Azerbaijan.

References

Populated places in Goygol District